Weymann Fabric Bodies is a patented design system for fuselages for aircraft and superlight coachwork for motor vehicles. The system used a patent-jointed wood frame covered in fabric. It was popular on cars from the 1920s until the early 1930s as it reduced the usual squeaks and rattles of coachbuilt bodies by its use of flexible joints between body timbers.

The system when used on cars provided quieter travel, and improved performance because of the body's light weight; but gave little protection in the event of a serious accident, and without care (the materials being prone to rot), a potentially short life.   Fabric provided a matt surface and the framework sharp corners. Later supporting metal corner-inserts were employed to smooth corners and the fabric could be finished with layer upon layer of hand-sanded paint, called Tôle Souple, giving the impression of polished metal panelling.

Introduced to the market in 1921, Weymann's bodies fell out of popularity within a decade.

Weymann body system

The Weymann system comprises an ultra-light wood framework with special metal joints so that timber does not touch timber. Small metal panels are inserted between the fabric and the framework to make rounded external corners. Straining wires are fitted to hold the doors in shape when they are stressed by acceleration or bumps.  The frame is then covered with muslin over chicken wire with a thin layer of cotton batting used to span large open areas and over this a top layer of fabric, usually a pigmented synthetic leather, is placed. Any exposed joints in the fabric are covered with aluminium mouldings. The seats are fixed directly to the chassis.

Passengers were therefore in almost direct contact with the firmly mounted engine. Where the market permitted some isolation was provided by luxuriously sprung passenger-seating often topped with inflated pneumatic cushions. For the luxury market it further encouraged the development of inherently smoother multi-cylinder engines in place of sixes and eights and, too late for Weymann, the introduction of flexible engine mounts and better chassis suspension systems in place of primitive leaf springs.

Advantages when compared with conventional coachbuilt construction
J Gurney Nutting of Chelsea, London, assured purchasers of his Weymann bodies, including The Prince of Wales:
 Absolute silence
 As durable as any other body
 Withstands rough roads and speed
 No squeaks, rattles, or draughts
 Absence of drumming and rumbling
 Lightness increases operating economy and speed
 Most luxurious
 Perfect comfort in any weather
 Less expensive than coachbuilt composite bodies of similar quality
 Easily cared for
 Easy to wash and clean
 Easily repaired in case of accident

Designer and patent holder
The system was invented by Charles Weymann (1889–1976). An early portrait may be seen in the archives of FLIGHT magazine.

Weymann's Paris coachbuilding business was located at Carrossier Weymann, 20 rue Troyon, Paris and their elegant and luxurious  Bugatti, Rolls-Royce, Hispano-Suiza, etc. bodied limousines and cars bore the label Les Carrosseries C. T. Weymann, 18-20 rue Troyon, Paris.

Construction Z
Daimler had always built their own bodies though as usual in that period to suit customers they provided a large number of chassis to external coach builders. In the second quarter of 1924 Daimler began building Weymann flexible framed fabric bodies for their "natural silence, the entire absence of drumming and all those attributes  which make for comfortable long-distance touring with a minimum of fatigue". Seats were Dryad basket-chairs of wicker button-quilted in Bedford cord. Daimler chose to name its Weymann-type bodies Construction Z.

Coachbuilder licensees

The licensing company which provided customers with permits to make Weymann fabric bodies for fitting to chassis was based in Paris. Weymann claimed 123 licensees of his patents and that he received payment for around 70,000 bodies.

Licensed manufacturers included:
Weymann Motor Bodies limited, founded in England in 1922 with the first licences issued in 1923 to, amongst others, the Rover Company. In 1925 a move was made into actual body production as well as licensing and the Cunard coachbuilding company based in Putney, South London, was purchased.  The enterprise was a success and a move was made to larger premises at what had been the Blériot aircraft factory, Addlestone near Weybridge, Surrey, England. By 1930 the company had turned its attention to bus body construction and in 1932 became part of the Metro Cammell Weymann organisation.
Weymann American Body Company of Indianapolis, USA
Carrozzeria Touring, Milan Lombardy Italy and its own development, Superleggera. See detail in Wikipedia  en français

English licensees 1928
From a joint advertisement by the following Makers of Genuine Weymann bodies, placed by Weymann Motor Bodies (1925) Limited, 47 Pall Mall, London, SW1

Gallery

See also
 Body-on-frame
 Spaceframe
 Monocoque

References

External links

Coachbuilt Weymann American webpage, including numerous technical illustrations, and the following references to Weymann bodies: May, 1927 issue of MoToR; a 1930 Stutz brochure; January 1930 issue of Autobody; the August 1929 "press release" detailing the new Stutz Weymann Chateau model; mention of J. Gurney Nutting Co., Ltd. 
Voisin C7 (a Weymann-bodied Voisin) under restoration 

Coachbuilders of France
Automotive technologies
Defunct motor vehicle manufacturers of France
Vintage vehicles